Earling may refer to:

 Earling, Iowa, United States
 Earling, West Virginia, United States
 Debra Magpie Earling (born 1957), Native American author
 The Earling, a ceremony to invest a new Earl in the novel Titus Groan by Mervyn Peake

See also
 Erlang (programming language)
 Earlington (disambiguation)